The Walls of Malapaga ((Beyond the Gates)), is a 1949 French-Italian  drama film directed by René Clément and starring Jean Gabin, Isa Miranda and Andrea Checchi. It was a co-production made by Francinex and Italia Produzione,  produced by Alfredo Guarini from a screenplay by Cesare Zavattini, Suso Cecchi d'Amico and Alfredo Guarini adapted by Jean Aurenche and Pierre Bost. The music score was by Roman Vlad and the cinematography by Louis Page. It was made at the Farnesina Studios of Titanus in Rome with sets designed by the art director Piero Filippone and Luigi Gervasi.

Plot summary
Gabin is Pierre Arrignon, a French criminal, on the run who finds himself in Genoa, Italy, and falls in love with Marta Manfredini (Isa Miranda), a local woman. The film is set in Italy, and the dialogue is primarily in French.

Cast
 Jean Gabin as Pierre Arrignon
 Isa Miranda as Marta Manfredini
 Vera Talchi as Cecchina, Marta's daughter
 Andrea Checchi as Giuseppe, Marta's husband
 Robert Dalban as the mariner
 Ave Ninchi as Maria, the neighbour
 Checco Rissone as the forger
 Renato Malavasi as the dentist
 Carlo Tamberlani as the inspector
 Vittorio Duse as the agent

Awards
The Walls of Malapaga was highly regarded in its day: It won an honorary Academy Award for Best Foreign Language Film and both Clément and Miranda won awards at the 1949 Cannes Film Festival.

References

External links

1949 films
1940s French-language films
Best Foreign Language Film Academy Award winners
Films directed by René Clément
Films set in Genoa
Films with screenplays by Jean Aurenche
Films with screenplays by Pierre Bost
Films with screenplays by Suso Cecchi d'Amico
Films with screenplays by Cesare Zavattini
Films awarded an Academy Honorary Award
French black-and-white films
Italian black-and-white films
1949 drama films
Italian drama films
1940s French films
1940s Italian films